A Low Life Mythology is a 2012 film directed by Lior Shamriz and starring Nina Fog and Johannes Hendrik Langer. It was written by the director with some improvisations by the cast and includes guest appearances by artists Hito Steyerl, Wolfgang Müller and others. The film premiered at the 2012 Achtung Berlin Film Festival.

Plot 
Mana Avaris is a foreign art student from an obscure country who lives in Berlin, Germany. According to her own testimony in the film, she's attending the school solely for the purpose of obtaining a visa. At a house party in Kreuzberg, Mana runs into Asten, a young dreamy man. The story of their relationship unfolds throughout the film.

Within the film are the art works supposedly made by Mana, Asten and their social circle. They are mostly essay films but some were materialized as real performances to an unsuspecting audience, such as the full-nudity monologue by Shirley Rosenthal which was recorded live at the Barbie Deinhoff queer bar, a known establishment in Berlin.

The film deals with an imaginary world based in narrative deconstruction, in the deformation and experimentation of the figure, in the image that overflows its materiality to break down, revive and divide itself. Many historical references dealing with foreignness and multiculturalism appear in the film, in characters' names (Avaris being the capital of the Hyksos in Egypt) and the films the characters present each other, such as Nabonidus and Cyrus and the destruction of the Library of Alexandria. The writing credits were attributed to Pierre Menard, a fictional character from a short story by Jorge Luis Borges

Cast

Production
The film was produced with a grant by Medienboard Berlin-Brandenburg and the French art foundation Bambi. It showed at the Thessaloniki International Film Festival as part of a retrospective for the director and was later nominated to the Prize of the German National Gallery for young Film Art.

See also
 Lior Shamriz filmography

References

External links 

2012 drama films
2012 films
Films set in Berlin
English-language German films
German avant-garde and experimental films
German drama films
2010s avant-garde and experimental films
2010s English-language films
2010s German films